Noora Helena Räty (born 29 May 1989) is a Finnish ice hockey goaltender,  playing in the Naisten Liiga (NSML) with HPK Kiekkonaiset. She is affiliated with the Minnesota chapter of the Professional Women's Hockey Players Association (PWHPA) and is a founding member of the organization's board.

Regarded as one of the best goaltenders in the world, Räty has won two Olympic bronze medals and has competed in four Olympic Games as a member of the Finnish national ice hockey team, earning All-Star honours at the 2018 tournament. Across nine IIHF World Championships, she has earned five medals and has been awarded Best Goaltender five times, named to the All-Star Team four times, and was the MVP in 2008. 

A two time NCAA Ice Hockey Tournament champion and two time All-American, Räty holds the NCAA Division I all-time career records for best save percentage, most shutouts, and most wins. Her club career has included playing in the Canadian Women's Hockey League (CWHL), the Naisten SM-sarja, and the Russian Women's Hockey League, in addition to being the first woman to play as a goaltender in both the Finnish men's second- and third-tier professional leagues, the Mestis and the Suomi-sarja.

Playing career
Räty began her senior club career at age 15 with the Espoo Blues of the Naisten SM-sarja, the top women's ice hockey league in Finland (renamed Naisten Liiga in 2017). In her first season, 2005–06, she recorded stellar a .951 save percentage (SV%) and 1.40 goals against average (GAA) while playing in 20 of 22 games. The phenomenal season earned her the Naisten SM-sarja Rookie of the Year Award in 2005–06; in 2010, the award was renamed in her honour as the Noora Räty Award. The teen continued to impress over the following seasons, earning the Naisten SM-sarja Best Goaltender Award in 2006–07 and the Playoff MVP Award in 2007–08 and 2008–09. During the four seasons she was active in the Naisten SM-sarja, 2005–06 to 2008–09, she played 55 regular season games and recorded 14 shutouts while maintaining a save percentage above .960. Across 28 Finnish Championship playoff games, she had a GAA of just 1.15 and tallied 8 shutouts, leading the Espoo Blues to three consecutive championship victories.

In addition to playing in the Naisten SM-liiga, Räty trained and competed with the Espoo Blues men's junior A team in the Nuorten SM-liiga, the top junior league in Finland. She also attended  lukio (advanced secondary school, comparable to gymnasium) at the Haukilahden lukio in the Haukilahti neighborhood of her hometown of Espoo and played ice hockey with the school team, earning the school's Hockey Player of the Year award in 2006 and 2008.

Minnesota Golden Gophers
Räty was recruited by the University of Minnesota to play ice hockey with the Minnesota Golden Gophers, a member of the Western Collegiate Hockey Association (WCHA) of NCAA Division I. She began her college ice hockey career at the university in the autumn of 2009 with fellow Finnish national team player Mira Jalosuo. Räty's first start in goal for the Gophers came in the team's second game of the 2009–10 season at home against Syracuse University (a 4–1 win). Through the WCHA conference tournament on 7 March 2010, Räty amassed a 17–3–4 record in 24 starts with 7 shutouts, a GAA of 1.24, and a save percentage of .951.

Räty won a number of WCHA conference awards during the 2009–10 season, being named WCHA Goaltending Champion (based on GAA), the goaltender of the All-WCHA First Team, and the goaltender of the All-WCHA Rookie Team. Räty was also named the WCHA Defensive Player of the Week four times and WCHA Rookie of the Week once.

In March 2010, Räty became only the second freshman to be a finalist for the Patty Kazmaier Award. She set a Golden Gophers club record for most assists in one season by a goaltender (3).

To start the 2010–11 season, Raty had a shutout in the first three games of the season. On 22 and 23 October 2010, she recorded back to back shutouts against the St. Cloud State Huskies. She held the Huskies scoreless as Minnesota swept the series by scores of 5–0 and 3–0, respectively. Raty played the full 120:00 minutes of the series. She accumulated 14 saves in the first game and 18 in the second for a 32-goal shutout.

Räty played on national championship teams in 2011–12 and 2012–13. The 2012–13 team finished 41–0–0, and the team won the last 49 games of Räty's career. Räty finished with both the career and single-season record for shutouts.

Kiekko-Vantaa
In March 2014, Yle reported that Räty had signed a contract for the 2014–15 season with Kiekko-Vantaa of the Mestis, the second level of Finnish men's hockey after the Liiga. She would become only the second woman to play in the Mestis, the first being Hayley Wickenheiser in 2003 with HC Salamat.

Räty was loaned to the Bewe TuusKi of the Suomi-sarja, the third level of Finnish men's hockey, for the beginning of the season. She played her first Mestis game for Kiekko-Vantaa on 22 October 2014, becoming the first Finnish woman and first female goaltender to play in the league.

CWHL
Selected in the first round of the 2017 CWHL Draft by the Chinese expansion team Kunlun Red Star WIH, she emerged as a key contributor for a club that finished the 2017–18 CWHL season in second place. Räty's first win with the Red Star took place on 28 October 2017, a 4–3 overtime win versus the Calgary Inferno in which she recorded 39 saves. Coincidentally, Annina Rajahuhta, a teammate from the Finnish national team, recorded the game-winning goal in overtime. 

By season's end, Räty emerged as the CWHL's regular season goaltending champion, leading the league in goals against average. She also tied with Emerance Maschmeyer of Les Canadiennes for most shutouts, with 6. Räty won the CWHL Goaltender of the Year Award, becoming the first European-born goaltender to capture the honor.

Räty was the starting goaltender for the Red Star in the 2018 Clarkson Cup finals, which were held in Toronto. Challenging the Markham Thunder, the contest went into overtime, where Laura Stacey scored with 2:11 left in the 4-on-4 overtime, as Markham prevailed by a 2–1 tally for its first-ever championship title. Räty recorded 37 saves in the contest.

International play 
Räty has been a member of the Finnish women's national team since the age of 15 and has recorded over 100 games in net for the team. At the age of 16, she participated with Team Finland in the women's ice hockey tournament at the 2006 Winter Olympics in Turin.

During the 2008 World Championships, Räty recorded a 30-save shutout of Team USA for a 1–0 victory. She was named the Best Goalie of the Tournament by the Directorate in 2007 and in 2008, and earned the Most Valuable Player of the Tournament award in 2008. At the 2009 World Championships she maintained a 1.48 goals against average and a 3–1–0 record, backstopping Finland for their second-straight bronze medal.

She won a bronze medal at the 2010 Four Nations Cup in St. John's, Newfoundland.

Noora Räty would post a shutout in the gold medal of the 2017 Nations Cup against the Canadian Women's Development Team, which featured opposing goaltender Emerance Maschmeyer. Finland prevailed in a 1–0 final that saw Michelle Karvinen log the game-winning tally.

Personal life 
Räty is one of the nine founding board members of the Professional Women's Hockey Players’ Association (PWHPA) and the only one to hold citizenship outside of North America. She has spoken about her hopes that the NHL will create a professional women's national hockey league in North America and her desire to play a part in the creation of such a league.

Räty and her partner, Karel Popper, became engaged in June 2019.  Popper is a professional goaltending instructor with MEGA Goaltending and joined the KRS Vanke Rays Shenzhen as a goaltending coach for the 2020–21 ZhHL season. The couple reside in Minneapolis with their dog, Dino.

Career statistics

Regular season and playoffs 

*Italics indicate totals calculated from incomplete statistics
Sources: CWHL, Elite Prospects, University of Minnesota Athletics, ZhHL

International 

Sources:

Awards and honors

References

External links
 
 
 
 

1989 births
Living people
Espoo Blues Naiset players
Finnish expatriate ice hockey players in China
Finnish expatriate ice hockey players in Russia
Finnish expatriate ice hockey players in the United States
Finnish women's ice hockey goaltenders
HPK Kiekkonaiset players
Ice hockey players at the 2006 Winter Olympics
Ice hockey players at the 2010 Winter Olympics
Ice hockey players at the 2014 Winter Olympics
Ice hockey players at the 2018 Winter Olympics
Ilves Naiset players
Kiekko-Vantaa players
Medalists at the 2010 Winter Olympics
Medalists at the 2018 Winter Olympics
Minnesota Golden Gophers women's ice hockey players
Naisten Liiga All-Stars
Olympic bronze medalists for Finland
Olympic ice hockey players of Finland
Olympic medalists in ice hockey
Professional Women's Hockey Players Association players
Shenzhen KRS Vanke Rays players
Sportspeople from Espoo